Bryanthus is a monotypic genus of ornamental plant in the flowering plant family Ericaceae, with the sole species Bryanthus musciformis, native to Japan, Kamchatka, and the Kuril Islands.  The genus was created in 1769. In 2012, the new tribe Bryantheae was proposed based on genetic analysis, containing the genera Bryanthus and Ledothamnus.

Former species
Species that have been placed in Bryanthus include:
 Bryanthus aleuticus (Spreng.) A.Gray, synonym of Phyllodoce aleutica
 Bryanthus empetriformis , synonym of Phyllodoce empetriformis
 Bryanthus × erectus , synonym of × Phyllothamnus erectus
 Bryanthus glanduliflorus (Hook.) A.Gray, synonym of Phyllodoce glanduliflora
 Bryanthus intermedius , synonym of Phyllodoce × intermedia

References 

Ericoideae
Monotypic Ericaceae genera